Martin Kerr is an American neo-Nazi who is the current commander of the New Order of the American Nazi Party. Kerr assumed office in 2014.

Commandership of the American Nazi Party 
Kerr assumed office in 2014 after Matthias Koehl, a commander of the New Order died at the age of 79, after 25 years of commandership of the party, and by that time Kerr was a long time member of the New Order.

Claims about white supremacy 
Kerr claims that the New Order of the American Nazi Party is no longer a white supremacist group and focuses on advocating "in favor of [white] people, not against other races or ethnicities...we consider the white people of the world to be a gigantic family of racial brothers and sisters, united by ties of common ancestry and common heritage. Being for our own family does not mean that we hate other families.", however the Southern Poverty Law Center (SPLC) still classifies them as neo-Nazis and as a "hate group."

American Nazi Party members
Living people
Year of birth missing (living people)
Place of birth missing (living people)

References